BayRidge Hospital is a psychiatric hospital located in Lynn, Massachusetts.

BayRidge, which in 2011 affiliated with Northeast Health System, in 2019 became an affiliate of Beth Israel Deaconess Medical Center.

References 

Healthcare in Massachusetts